Seelze is a town in the district of Hanover, in Lower Saxony, Germany. Today Seelze mainly plays the role of a bedroom town for commuters working in Hanover.

Division of the town

 Seelze (city centre)
 Letter
 Almhorst
 Dedensen
 Lohnde
 Döteberg
 Harenberg
 Gümmer
 Velber
 Kirchwehren
 Lathwehren

Museum
The local museum and museum of local history is situated in a timber-framed building from 1856 at the incorporated district of Letter. Subjects of the museum include history of Seelze and its incorporated villages, history of the integration of German postwar refugees from former German territories that are now a part of Russia and Poland, and history of the Seelze marshalling yard. About tree times a year special exhibitions are shown. The permanent exhibition shows a shoemaker's workshop from about 1930, a hairdresser's shop from about 1920, a schoolroom of a village from about 1900, and a living room of about 1900.

Transport

Railway
Seelze and its subdivisions have three stations on the Hanover S-Bahn network: Letter, Seelze and Dedensen/Gümmer. All are located on the lines S1 and S2.

The  is an important marshalling yard in Germany. With about 200 freight trains a day beginning, ending or passing through the yard, it is a major European marshalling yard and one of the biggest in Germany.

Twin towns – sister cities

Seelze is twinned with:
 Grand-Couronne, France
 Mosina, Poland
 Schkeuditz, Germany

References

External links

Official website 

Hanover Region